Eveready Pictures is a Pakistani film and television production and distribution company. Since its inception in the 1947s, the company has grown to be one of the largest film studios in Pakistan.

Films produced

Films distributed
In addition to the films produced by Eveready Pictures since 1947, the following films from other banners were distributed, in domestic and/or overseas markets, by the company.

Television

References

External links 
Official website

Television production companies of Pakistan
Mass media companies of Pakistan
Film distributors of Pakistan
Film production companies of Pakistan
Mass media in Sindh